

Events

China
The Catholic Church in Lungshui, Sichuan province is attacked by a mob of 30,000 people. Supposedly supported by the Big Sword and White Lotus Societies, the attack would be the last of the societies' anti-foreigner campaigns as several of their leaders are executed and the remaining members return to daily lives.

United States
Frank Lyons is pardoned by Louisiana Governor Francis T. Nicholls and again re-forms the Yellow Henry Gang.
January 25 – After the capture of two burglars the previous week in Elizabethtown, New Jersey, police close in on the remaining members of the Oak Street Gang who had been committing burglary over the past several months in the city of New Haven, Connecticut arresting five more members.
May 5 – Members of the Provenzano faction of the New Orleans Mafia ambush several longshoremen belonging to the Matranga faction, wounding three members of the Matrangas, including Anthony "Tony" Matranga (who eventually will have his leg amputated).
October 15 – New Orleans Police Chief David C. Hennessy is shot by unknown assailants, believed to be an Italian extortionist organization, while investigating a gang war between rival factions. Claiming that "the dagoes did it," the critically wounded Hennessey is taken to the hospital where he dies the next day (Oct. 16). His murder and the acquittal of 17 suspects cause a lynch mob to storm the jail house and hang 11 of the men on March 14, 1891. The later anti-Italian riots would leave a long lasting resentment toward immigrants for decades.

Arts and literature

Births
Joseph Zucker, New York-Cleveland liaison and New York racketeer

Deaths
October 16 – David C. Hennessy, New Orleans police chief

References

Organized crime
Years in organized crime